Claiborne Joseph Cheramie (September 9, 1938 – September 26, 2016), better known by his stage name Joe Clay, was an American rockabilly musician. He was from Gretna, Louisiana, United States.

Career
Clay was born in Harvey, Louisiana, United States. His parents encouraged an early interest in country music and at the age of 12, he was already a competent drummer, later also learning rhythm guitar and electric bass. Clay began performing at that age in a country band, who were offered a spot performing on the local radio station WWEZ. RCA subsidiary Vik Records signed him a few years later, while he was still in his teens; he recorded in New York with guitarists Mickey Baker and Skeeter Best, bassist Leonard Gaskin, and drummers Bobby Donaldson and Joe Marshall. He drove a school bus for 15 years in the New Orleans area. "During 1955 his local reputation enabled him to play the prestigious Louisiana Hayride out of Shreveport where he shared billing with the newly emerging Elvis Presley."  The source also mentioned he filled in as a drummer for Presley when he played Pontchartrain Amusement Park in New Orleans, when D.J. Fontana could not make the gig.

In 1956, he appeared on The Ed Sullivan Show, a few months before Elvis Presley performed thereon, and Clay played a cover of The Platters' hit "Only You (And You Alone)". Clay would later play guitar on some of Presley's recordings, but his manager would not let him tour outside the New Orleans area, and he never scored a hit.

After being dropped from RCA, he continued performing in New Orleans for over 30 years. In the 1980s, the rockabilly revival in Europe resulted in renewed interest in Clay; he then toured England in 1986.

In 1991, Clay was interviewed and featured in Cat Tales fanzine, appearing on the cover. He talked about his early success, fading into obscurity, then being rediscovered. 

In 2008, he appeared in an award-winning Canadian documentary entitled Rockabilly 514, directed by Patricia Chica and Mike Wafer. He spoke about his early beginnings as a rockabilly musician in the 1950s and his fascination for the new generation of rockabilly followers. He is also seen performing live his single, "Sixteen Chicks", among an enthusiastic crowd of young rockabilly fans.

In 2011, Clay in performance at the NOLA House Of Blues, was inducted into the Louisiana Music Hall Of Fame.

Clay headlined The Rockers Reunion in the Rivermeade Leisure Centre, Reading, England on January 23, 2016.

Clay died on September 26, 2016 at the age of 78.

Discography

References

American rockabilly musicians
1938 births
2016 deaths
People from Gretna, Louisiana
People from Harvey, Louisiana
Country musicians from Louisiana